Cretone is a frazione of the comune of Palombara Sabina, in the Province of Rome, central Italy.

Geography
Its territory is mostly covered by forests and farmland.

History
The appearance of this ancient origins are documented by the numerous archaeological findings and writings of the past. The village of Cretone occupies a hill, on top of which stands the medieval country. The hill Cretone forward to the wide esplanade of Cerreto-Quirani, considerably lower and surrounded mild undulations of the same composition arenaceo-conglomeratica. The plain is the result of refilling the valleys of two streams coming from the west side of the Lucretilis Mons along the ditch of Grottoline-Molaccia has found an interesting part of the necropolis. This returns valuable objects that allow age to enter the center in Cretone facies sabina culture imbued with Etruscan influences.

The only archaeological intervention dates back to 1983 when the Soprintendenza Archeologica Lazio digging for a group of burial trench, dated to 7th–6th century.

The construction of the castle and the 13th-century medieval village, in whose walls are included pottery fragments. It is possible that the village is in archaic prolong the plateau to the north end of the hill, covered from the construction of the square of 900 boats, the peak could be used to be isolated with a moat that the bottleneck in the league group of Three Southern Hills.

Festivals and events
The patron saint is St. Vitus (San Vito) martyr who is celebrated on 15 June. In the second half of July there is a "Peach Festival" festival in honor of one of the most fruit is grown in the surrounding countryside.

Economy
Agriculture is the main activity in the territory. The geographical position in central Italy with the Lucretili mountains providing protection to the east and a superlative climate for agriculture, allow Cretone to produce high-quality goods. Although time is developing tourist activity linked to a spa, and proximity to the Lucretilis Mons Regional Park.

Some areas in Cretonne produce extra-virgin olive oil with DOP recognition.

External links 

  Cretone web site

Frazioni of the Province of Rome
Cities and towns in Lazio
Roman sites in Lazio